The 1954 New Hampshire Wildcats football team was an American football team that represented the University of New Hampshire as a member of the Yankee Conference during the 1954 college football season. In its sixth year under head coach Chief Boston, the team compiled a 7–1 record (4–0 against conference opponents) and won the Yankee Conference championship.

Schedule

References

New Hampshire
New Hampshire Wildcats football seasons
New Hampshire Wildcats football